Andorra consists of seven communities known as parishes (singularparròquia). Until relatively recently, it had only six parishes; the seventh, Escaldes-Engordany, was created in 1978.

Overview
Andorra la Vella is the capital of Andorra. Some parishes have a further territorial subdivision; Ordino, La Massana and Sant Julià de Lòria are subdivided into quarts (quarters), while Canillo is subdivided into 10 veïnats (neighborhoods). Those mostly coincide with villages, which are found in all parishes.

Each parish has its own elected mayor who is the nominal head of the local government known as a comú in Catalan.

See also
ISO 3166-2:AD
List of cities in Andorra

References

External links

 
Andorra geography-related lists
Andorra 1
Parishes, Andorra
Andorra, Parishes
Subdivisions of Andorra